The 2019–20 San Jose Sharks season was the 29th season for the National Hockey League franchise that was established on May 9, 1990.

The season was suspended by the league officials on March 12, 2020, after several other professional and collegiate sports organizations followed suit as a result of the ongoing COVID-19 pandemic. On May 26, the NHL regular season was officially declared over with the remaining games being cancelled and the Sharks missed the playoffs for the first time since the 2014–15 season, and only the second time since 2002–03.

Regular season
The Sharks lost their season opener 4–1 to the Vegas Golden Knights on October 2. Erik Karlsson missed the game due to the birth of his daughter.

Standings

Divisional standings

Western Conference

Tiebreaking procedures
 Fewer number of games played (only used during regular season).
 Greater number of regulation wins (denoted by RW).
 Greater number of wins in regulation and overtime (excluding shootout wins; denoted by ROW).
 Greater number of total wins (including shootouts).
 Greater number of points earned in head-to-head play; if teams played an uneven number of head-to-head games, the result of the first game on the home ice of the team with the extra home game is discarded.
 Greater goal differential (difference between goals for and goals against).
 Greater number of goals scored (denoted by GF).

Schedule and results

Preseason
The preseason schedule was announced on June 17, 2019.

Regular season
The schedule was announced on June 25, 2019.

Player statistics

Skaters

Goaltenders

†Denotes player spent time with another team before joining the Sharks. Stats reflect time with the Sharks only.
‡Denotes player was traded mid-season. Stats reflect time with the Sharks only.
Bold/italics denotes franchise record.

Transactions
The Sharks have been involved in the following transactions during the 2019–20 season.

Trades

Free agents

Waivers

Contract terminations

Signings

Draft picks

Below are the San Jose Sharks' selections at the 2019 NHL Entry Draft, which was held on June 21 and 22, 2019, at the Rogers Arena in Vancouver, British Columbia.

Notes:
 The Vegas Golden Knights' second-round pick went to the San Jose Sharks as the result of a trade on June 22, 2019, that sent Philadelphia's second-round pick in 2019 (41st overall) to Vegas in exchange for Winnipeg's third-round pick in 2019 (82nd overall) and this pick.
 The Nashville Predators' second-round pick went to the San Jose Sharks as the result of a trade on June 22, 2019, that sent Winnipeg's third-round pick in 2019 (82nd overall) and a third-round pick in 2019 (91st overall) to New Jersey in exchange for this pick.
 The Montreal Canadiens' fourth-round pick went to the San Jose Sharks as the result of a trade on June 22, 2019, that sent a fourth-round pick in 2020 to Montreal in exchange for this pick.
 The Vancouver Canucks' sixth-round pick went to the San Jose Sharks as the result of a trade on June 22, 2019, that sent Francis Perron and a seventh-round pick in 2019 (215th overall) to Vancouver in exchange for Tom Pyatt and this pick.

Awards

Hertl replaced Logan Couture, who was unable to participate in the All-Star Game due to an injury.

References

San Jose Sharks seasons
San Jose Sharks
Sharks
Sharks